Ephraim Eliyahu Lisitzky (31 January 1885 – 25 June 1962) was an American Hebrew poet, writer, and educator.

Biography
Born in Minsk in 1885, Lisitzky spent his childhood in Slutzk before moving to Boston with his father in 1900. He spent a brief time studying at the Rabbi Yitzḥak Elḥanan Yeshiva, and received a degree in pharmaceutical chemistry from Marquette University. He afterward spent years teaching Hebrew and Jewish studies in various locations in the United States and Canada. In 1918, he was appointed head of the Communal Hebrew School in New Orleans, where he remained until his retirement.

Lisitzky was a member of the Zionist Organization of America and the Histradut Ivrit. Still, despite his early plans to emigrate to Israel, Lisitzky only visited there twice and remained ambivalent about the prospect throughout his life.

He died in New Orleans in 1962 after a long illness.

Work
Lisitzky is credited with making significant contributions to the representation of marginalized groups in Hebrew literature. He is perhaps best known for his epic poem Medurot do'akhot ('Dying Campfires', 1937), written in unrhymed trochaic tetrameter, which is based on Native American legends. His collection of poems Be'oholey Kush ('In the Tents of Cush', 1953) draws inspiration from African-American folktales and spirituals.

In addition to his poetry, Lisitzky also wrote a number of articles on literature and educational matters in the Hebrew press, which were collected in his book, Bi-shevilei ḥayyim ve-sifrut ('In the Paths of Life and Literature', 1961). He is also the only American Hebrew poet to have written an autobiography, which was published under the title Eleh toldot Adam ('These Are the Generations of Adam', 1959).

Honours
He was awarded honorary doctorates from the Jewish Theological Seminary of America in 1949 and the Hebrew Union College – Jewish Institute of Religion in 1960 for his literary achievements.

Selected bibliography

 
 
 
 
 
 
 
 
 
 
  Translation of Eleh toldot adam into English.
 
 
 "Yulius Keisar" . In

References

1885 births
1962 deaths
20th-century American educators
20th-century American poets
20th-century American translators
American male poets
Emigrants from the Russian Empire to the United States
English–Hebrew translators
Hebrew-language poets
Jewish American poets
Jewish educators
Jews and Judaism in New Orleans
Marquette University alumni
Poets from Louisiana
Translators of William Shakespeare
Writers from Minsk
Writers from New Orleans